is a Japanese gymnast. She competed at the 2000 Summer Olympics.

References

External links
 

1984 births
Living people
Japanese female artistic gymnasts
Olympic gymnasts of Japan
Gymnasts at the 2000 Summer Olympics
People from Gifu
21st-century Japanese women